The 2015–16 Momentum One Day Cup was a domestic one-day cricket championship in South Africa. It was the 35th time the championship was contested. The competition started on 9 October 2015 and the final took place on 28 February 2016. The Lions won the final against the Cape Cobras by 8 wickets

Group stage

Points table

RESULT POINTS:

 Win – 4
 Tie – 2 each
 No Result – 2 each
 Loss – 0

Knockout stage
Of the 6 participants, the following 3 teams qualified for the knockout stage:

Semi-final

Final

Statistics

Most Runs

Most Wickets

External links
 Series home at ESPN Cricinfo

References

South African domestic cricket competitions
Momentum One Day Cup
2015–16 South African cricket season